State Highway 74 (SH-74) is a short state highway that travels between U.S. Route 93 and U.S. Route 30 in downtown Twin Falls.  The road is located entirely in Twin Falls County.

Route description
State Highway 74 begins at a junction with U.S. Route 93 southwest of Twin Falls. The highway heads east through some farmland as E 3600 N, turning north to N 2900 E near the Magic Valley Regional Airport. It enters Twin Falls as Washington Street (later Shoshone Street) and crosses Rock Creek to reach downtown. The highway terminates at an intersection with 2nd Avenue, which carries U.S. Route 30 through downtown Twin Falls.

Major intersections

References 

074
Transportation in Twin Falls County, Idaho